, meaning "purified place of Utaki," is a historical sacred space, overlooking Kudaka Island, that served as one of the key locations of worship in the native religion of the Ryukyuan people for millennia. Later as a part of assimilation of Okinawa by Japan, it was shifted to serve as a Shinto Shrine.  It is part of the UNESCO World Heritage Site Gusuku Sites and Related Properties of the Kingdom of Ryukyu in Nanjō, Okinawa.

Sefa Utaki is on the Chinen Peninsula, and has been recognized as a sacred place since the earliest period of Ryukyuan history. According to Chūzan Seikan, this was the spot where Amamikyu, goddess of creation, made landfall on Okinawa. The shrine area itself comprises a number of caves and overhanging ledges opening to the east and south among towering rock formations of a high promontory over the sea. All buildings have been destroyed, but the outer and inner precincts can still be traced.

Notes

References

Kerr, George H. (1953).  Ryukyu Kingdom and Province before 1945. Washington, D.C.: Pacific Science Board, National Academy of Sciences, National Research Council. 
 Yamakage, Motohisa, Paul de Leeuw and Aidan Rankin. (2006).  The essence of Shinto. Tokyo: Kodansha International.  

Ryukyu Islands
World Heritage Sites in Japan
Historic Sites of Japan